Ribonuclease P protein subunit p14 is an enzyme that in humans is encoded by the RPP14 gene.

References

Further reading